Abondance is a semi-hard, fragrant, raw-milk cheese made in the Haute-Savoie department of France. Its name comes from a small commune also called Abondance. Abondance is made exclusively from milk produced by the Abondance, montbéliarde, and tarine breeds of cattle. By 2022, the herd producing the milk for Abondance cheese will need to be a minimum of 55 percent of the herd. In 1998, 873 tonnes were produced (+16.4 percent since 1996), 34 percent from local farms.

Abondance cheese was granted an Appellation d'origine contrôlée or AOC in 1990.

The region has been known for its cheese since at least the 14th century when monks from the Sainte Marie d'Abondance Monastery are recorded to have supplied cheese to the papal conclave at Avignon.

Abondance cheese can be either artisanal or farm-made; it is now made exclusively in the area of Abondance in Chablais, Haute-Savoie.

The ageing period for Abondance is a minimum of three months on specially-prepared spruce boards.

See also
 List of cheeses

References

External links 

Cheeses with designation of origin protected in the European Union
Cow's-milk cheeses
French cheeses
French products with protected designation of origin
Haute-Savoie